Jerry Thomas Twiggs (March 25, 1933 – January 15, 2000) was an American politician who served as a member of the Idaho Senate for the 31st district from 1986 to 2000.

Career 
Outside of politics, Twiggs worked as a farmer. He was elected to the Idaho Senate in 1986 and later served as Republican floor leader. He also served as the 38th president pro tempore of the Senate from 1993 until his death in 2000. Twiggs was a regional leader in the Church of Jesus Christ of Latter-day Saints.

Personal life 
Twiggs married his wife, Sandra, in the Idaho Falls Idaho Temple in 1951. They had two sons.

References 

1933 births
2000 deaths
Republican Party Idaho state senators
People from Bingham County, Idaho
Latter Day Saints from Idaho